Rufus C. Thomas, Jr. (March 26, 1917 – December 15, 2001) was an American rhythm-and-blues, funk, soul and blues singer, songwriter, dancer, DJ and comic entertainer from Memphis, Tennessee. He recorded for several labels, including Chess Records and Sun Records in the 1950s, before becoming established in the 1960s and 1970s at Stax Records. He is best known for his novelty dance records, including "Walking the Dog" (1963), "Do the Funky Chicken" (1969), and "(Do the) Push and Pull" (1970). According to the Mississippi Blues Commission, "Rufus Thomas embodied the spirit of Memphis music perhaps more than any other artist, and from the early 1940s until his death . . . occupied many important roles in the local scene."

He began his career as a tap dancer, vaudeville performer, and master of ceremonies in the 1930s. He later worked as a disc jockey on radio station WDIA in Memphis, both before and after his recordings became successful. He remained active into the 1990s and as a performer and recording artist was often billed as "The World's Oldest Teenager". He was the father of the singers Carla Thomas (with whom he recorded duets) and Vaneese Thomas and the keyboard player Marvell Thomas.

Early life
Thomas was born in the rural community of Cayce, Mississippi, on the outskirts of Memphis, Tennessee, the son of a sharecropper. He moved with his family to Memphis around 1920. His mother was a "church woman". Thomas made his debut as a performer at the age of six, playing a frog in a school theatrical production. By the age of 10, he was a tap dancer, performing on the streets and in amateur productions at Booker T. Washington High School, in Memphis. From the age of 13, he worked with Nat D. Williams, his high-school history teacher, who was also a pioneer black DJ at radio station WDIA and columnist for black newspapers, as a master of ceremonies at talent shows in the Palace Theater on Beale Street. After graduating from high school, Thomas attended Tennessee A&I University for one semester, but economic constraints led him to leave to pursue a career as a full-time entertainer.

Early career
Thomas began performing in traveling tent shows. In 1936 he joined the Rabbit Foot Minstrels, an all-black revue that toured the South, as a tap dancer and comedian, sometimes part of a duo, Rufus and Johnny.  He married Cornelia Lorene Wilson in 1940, at a service officiated by Rev. C. L. Franklin, the father of Aretha Franklin, and the couple settled in Memphis. Thomas worked a day job in the American Finishing Company textile bleaching plant, which he continued to do for over 20 years. He also formed a comedy and dancing duo, Rufus and Bones, with Robert "Bones" Couch, and they took over as MCs at the Palace Theater, often presenting amateur hour shows. One early winner was B.B. King, and others discovered by Thomas later in the 1940s included Bobby Bland and Johnny Ace.

In the early 1940s, Thomas began writing and performing his own songs. He regarded Louis Armstrong, Fats Waller and Gatemouth Moore as musical influences. He made his professional singing debut at the Elks Club on Beale Street, filling in for another singer at the last minute, and during the 1940s became a regular performer in Memphis nightclubs, such as Currie's Club Tropicana. As an established performer in Memphis, aged 33 in 1950, Thomas recorded his first 78 rpm single, for Jesse Erickson's small Star Talent label in Dallas, Texas. Thomas said, "I just wanted to make a record. I never thought of getting rich. I just wanted to be known, be a recording artist. . . . [But] the record sold five copies and I bought four of them." The record, "I'll Be a Good Boy" backed with "I'm So Worried", gained a Billboard review, which stated that "Thomas shows first class style on a slow blues". He also recorded for the Bullet label in Nashville, Tennessee, when he recorded with Bobby Plater's Orchestra and was credited as "Mr. Swing"; the recordings were not recognised by researchers as being by Thomas until 1996. In 1951 he made his first recordings at Sam Phillips's Sun Studio, for the Chess label, but they were not commercially successful.

He began working as a DJ at radio station WDIA in 1951, and hosted an afternoon R&B show called Hoot and Holler. WDIA, featuring an African-American format, was known as "the mother station of the Negroes" and became an important source of blues and R&B music for a generation, its audience consisting of white as well as black listeners. Thomas used to introduce his shows saying, "I'm young, I'm loose, I'm full of juice, I got the goose so what's the use. We're feeling gay though we ain't got a dollar, Rufus is here, so hoot and holler." He also used to lead tours of white teenagers on "midnight rambles" around Beale Street. Thomas claimed to be the first black DJ to play Elvis Presley records, which he did until the police made him stop due to segregation. He performed on stage with Elvis to an all-black audience, and although the police tried to shut it down, the audience stormed through to get to him. After that, the police allowed Elvis songs on black radio stations

His celebrity in the South was such that in 1953, at Sam Phillips's suggestion, he recorded "Bear Cat" for Sun Records, an "answer record" to Big Mama Thornton's R&B hit "Hound Dog". The record became the label's first national chart hit, reaching number 3 on the Billboard R&B chart. However, a copyright-infringement suit brought by Don Robey, the original publisher of "Hound Dog", nearly bankrupted the record label. After only one recording there, Thomas was one of the African-American artists released by Phillips, as he oriented his label more toward white audiences and signed Elvis Presley, who later recorded Thomas's song "Tiger Man". Thomas did not record again until 1956, when he made a single, "I'm Steady Holdin' On", for the Bihari brothers' Meteor label; musicians on the record included Lewie Steinberg, later a founding member of Booker T and the MGs.

Stax Records
In 1960 he made his first recordings with his 17-year-old daughter Carla, for the Satellite label in Memphis, which changed its name to Stax the following year. The song, "Cause I Love You", featuring a rhythm borrowed from Jesse Hill's "Ooh Poo Pa Doo", was a regional hit; the musicians included Thomas' son Marvell on keyboards, Steinberg, and the 16-year-old Booker T. Jones. The record's success led to Stax gaining production and distribution deal with the much larger Atlantic Records.

Rufus Thomas continued to record for the label after Carla's record "Gee Whiz (Look at His Eyes)" reached the national R&B chart in 1961. He had his own hit with "The Dog", a song he had originally improvised in performance based on a Willie Mitchell bass line, complete with imitations of a barking dog. The 1963 follow-up, "Walking the Dog", engineered by Tom Dowd of Atlantic, became one of his most successful records, reaching #10 on the Billboard pop chart. He became the first, and still the only, father to debut in the Top 10 after his daughter had first appeared there. The song was recorded in early 1964 by the Rolling Stones on their debut album, and was a minor UK chart hit for Merseybeat group the Dennisons later that year.

As well as recording and appearing on radio and in clubs, Thomas continued to work as a boiler operator in the textile plant, where he claimed the noises sometimes suggested musical rhythms and lyrics to him, before he finally gave up the job in 1963, to focus on his role as a singer and entertainer. He recorded a series of novelty dance tracks, including "Can Your Monkey Do the Dog'" and '"Somebody Stole My Dog" for Stax, where he was often backed by Booker T. & the MGs or the Bar-Kays. He also became a mentor to younger Stax stars, giving advice on stage moves to performers like Otis Redding, who partnered daughter Carla on record.

After "Jump Back" in 1964, the hits dried up for several years, as Stax gave more attention to younger artists and musicians. However, in 1970 he had another big hit with "Do the Funky Chicken", which reached #5 on the R&B chart, #28 on the pop chart, and #18 in Britain where it was his only chart hit. Thomas improvised the song while performing with Willie Mitchell's band at a club in Covington, Tennessee, including a spoken word section that he regularly used as a shtick as a radio DJ: "Oh I feel so unnecessary - this is the kind of stuff that makes you feel like you wanna do something nasty, like waste some chicken gravy on your white shirt right down front." The recording was produced by Al Bell and Tom Nixon, and used the Bar-Kays, featuring guitarist Michael Toles. Thomas continued to work with Bell and Nixon as producers, and later in 1970 had his only number 1 R&B hit [and his second-highest pop charting record] with another dance song, "Do the Push and Pull". A further dance-oriented release in 1971, "The Breakdown", climbed to number 2 R&B and number 31 Pop. In 1972, he featured in the Wattstax concert, and he had several further, less successful, hits before Stax collapsed in 1976.

Later career
Thomas continued to record and toured internationally, billing himself as "The World's Oldest Teenager" and describing himself as "the funkiest man alive". He "drew upon his vaudeville background to put [his songs] over on stage with fancy footwork that displayed remarkable agility for a man well into his fifties", and usually performed "while clothed in a wardrobe of hot pants, boots and capes, all in wild colors."

He continued as a DJ at WDIA until 1974, and worked for a period at WLOK before returning to WDIA in the mid-1980s to co-host a blues show. He appeared regularly on television and recorded albums for various labels. Thomas performed regularly at the Porretta Soul Festival in Italy; the outdoor amphitheater in which he performed was later renamed Rufus Thomas Park.

He played an important part in the Stax reunion of 1988, and appeared in Jim Jarmusch's 1989 film Mystery Train, Robert Altman's 1999 film Cookie's Fortune, and D. A. Pennebaker’s documentary Only the Strong Survive. Thomas released an album of straight-ahead blues, That Woman Is Poison!, with Alligator Records in 1988, featuring saxophonist Noble "Thin Man" Watts. In 1996, he and William Bell headlined at the Olympics in Atlanta, Georgia. In 1997, he released an album, Rufus Live!, on Ecko Records. In 1998, he hosted two New Year's Eve shows on Beale Street.

In 1997, to commemorate his 80th birthday, the City of Memphis renamed a road off Beale Street, close to the old Palace Theater, as Rufus Thomas Boulevard. He received a Pioneer Award from the Rhythm and Blues Foundation in 1992, and a lifetime achievement award from ASCAP in 1997. He was inducted into the Blues Hall of Fame in 2001.

Death and legacy

He died of heart failure in 2001, at the age of 84, at St. Francis Hospital in Memphis. He is buried next to his wife Lorene, who died in 2000, at the New Park Cemetery in Memphis.

Writer Peter Guralnick said of him:His music... brought a great deal of joy to the world, but his personality brought even more, conveying a message of grit, determination, indomitability, above all a bottomless appreciation for the human comedy that left little room for the drab or the dreary in his presence.

Thomas was honored with a marker on the Mississippi Blues Trail in Byhalia.

In popular culture
Bobby Brown portrays Thomas in the BET television series American Soul.

A character named Rufus in “Kill Bill: Volume 2” played with Rufus Thomas.

Discography

Albums
{| class="wikitable"
|-
! rowspan="2"| Year
! rowspan="2"| Title
! rowspan="2"| Catalogue ref
! colspan="3"| Peak chart positions
|-
! style="width:40px;"| US200
! style="width:40px;"| USR&B
|-
| style="text-align:center;"|1963
| Walking the Dog
| Stax 704
| align=center| 138
| align=center| —
|-
| style="text-align:center;" rowspan="2"|1970
| Do the Funky Chicken
| Stax STS-2028
| align=center| —
| align=center| 32
|-
| Rufus Thomas Live: Doing the Push & Pull at P.J.'s
| Stax STS-2039
| align=center| 147
| align=center| 19
|-
| style="text-align:center;"|1972
| Did You Heard Me?
| Stax STS-3004
| align=center| —
| align=center| —
|-
| style="text-align:center;"|1973
| Crown Prince of Dance
| Stax STS-3008
| align=center| —
| align=center| 42
|-
| style="text-align:center;"|1977
| If There Were No More Music
| AVI 6015
| align=center| —
| align=center| —
|-
| style="text-align:center;"|1978
| I Ain't Gettin' Older, I'm Gettin' Better
| AVI 6046
| align=center| —
| align=center| —
|-
| style="text-align:center;"|1988
| That Woman Is Poison!
| Alligator AL 4769
| align=center| —
| align=center| —
|-
| style="text-align:center;" rowspan="2"|1996
| Blues Thang!
| Sequel/Castle SEQ 1054
| align=center| —
| align=center| —
|-
| The Best of Rufus Thomas: Do the Funky Somethin'  (compilation)
| Rhino R2 72410
| align=center| —
| align=center| —
|-
| style="text-align:center;"|1997
| Rufus Live! [rec. 1996 at Southern Crossroads Festival in Atlanta, GA]
| Ecko ECD 1013
| align=center| —
| align=center| —
|-
| style="text-align:center;"|2000
| Swing Out with Rufus Thomas
| High Stacks HS 9982
| align=center| —
| align=center| —
|-
| style="text-align:center;"|2005
| Just Because I'm Leavin''' (posthumous)
| Segue Records SRRT05
| align=center| —
| align=center| —
|-
| colspan="6" style="text-align:center; font-size:9pt;"| "—" denotes releases that did not chart or were not released in that territory.
|}
Source:

Singles

Source:

References

Further reading
Greenberg, Steve. Do the Funky Somethin': The Best of Rufus Thomas'' (liner notes), Rhino Records, 1996.

External links

 Rufus Thomas Biography at Alligator Records
 Soulwalking.co.uk

1917 births
2001 deaths
20th-century American singers
20th-century African-American male singers
American blues singers
American funk singers
American soul singers
Blues musicians from Mississippi
Chess Records artists
People from Marshall County, Mississippi
Stax Records artists
Sun Records artists
Meteor Records artists
Tennessee State University alumni
20th-century American male singers
Mississippi Blues Trail
Alligator Records artists